E36 may refer to:
 Nimzo-Indian Defence, Encyclopaedia of Chess Openings code
 The BMW E36 automobile platform
 The European route E36  connecting Berlin to Bolesławiec
 The Federal Aviation Administration airport code of Georgetown Airport (California)
 Cryotech E36, a Potassium acetate based runway deicer
 Penang Bridge, route E36 in Malaysia